Mirrorcat was a 1960s  ocean-going catamaran sailboat designed by Rod Macalpine-Downie. The vessel took part in the 1967 Crystal Trophy race in the English Channel, and the first Round Britain and Ireland Race. At the time, it was considered one of the fastest ocean-going multihulls in the world.

See also
List of multihulls
Trifle (trimaran)

References

Individual catamarans
1960s sailing yachts